Leiv Blakset  (28 December 1928 – 22 May 2005) was a Norwegian politician.

He was born in Herøy to Knut Blakset and Agnes Olivia Bergset. He was elected representative to the Storting for the period 1985–1989 for the Centre Party.

References

1928 births
2005 deaths
People from Nordland
People from Herøy, Nordland
Centre Party (Norway) politicians
Members of the Storting